The Clairton-Glassport Bridge, officially the Senator Edward P. Zemprelli Bridge is a girder bridge that carries vehicular traffic across the Monongahela River between Glassport, Pennsylvania and Clairton, Pennsylvania.

It was opened on March 2, 1987, replacing a 1928 arch bridge that stood on the same site. The structure also passes over portions of the U.S. Steel Clairton Works, the largest coke producing facility in the United States.

References

Bridges over the Monongahela River
Bridges in Allegheny County, Pennsylvania
Road bridges in Pennsylvania
Girder bridges in the United States
Steel bridges in the United States